St. Mark's Square (abbreviated Trg sv. Marka, also known as Markov trg) is a square located in the old part of Zagreb, Croatia, called Gradec or Gornji grad.

In the center of square is located St. Mark's Church. The square also sports important governmental buildings: Banski dvori (the seat of the Government of Croatia), Croatian Parliament and Constitutional Court of Croatia. On the corner of St. Mark's Square and the Street of Ćiril and Metod is the Old City Hall, where the Zagreb City Council held its sessions.

In 2006, the square underwent a renovation project.  In August 2005, the Government forbid any form of protests on St. Mark's Square, which caused controversies in Croatian civil society. This ban was partially lifted in 2012.

Until 2020 the square was also the site of the inaugurations of Croatia's presidents. Franjo Tuđman took his oath as President of the Republic in 1992 and 1997, Stjepan Mesić in 2000 and 2005, Ivo Josipović in 2010, and Kolinda Grabar-Kitarović in 2015. However, in 2020 Zoran Milanović decided to take his oath in the Presidential Palace instead.

See also 
 2020 St. Mark's Square attack

References

Sources

Squares in Zagreb
Gornji Grad–Medveščak
Odonyms referring to religion